Sesame English is an American television/video series developed as a collaboration between Sesame Workshop and Berlitz International. Launched in 1999, with Taiwan and China as the debut markets, the series differs from the typical international versions of Sesame Street in that it was devised as a supplement to ESL (English as a Second Language) instruction. The target age group is children from 4 to 7 years old.

Italy began airing the show in 2004, and Poland as part of Sezamkowy Zakątek since 2006 to 2008 (titled Sezamkowy Angielski).

Format
The project includes 78 15-minute episodes for TV, along with instructional materials for print, audio, video, and CD-ROMs (although only 52 episodes were made). Dr. Lewis Bernstein, producer and key developer of the series, explained that "The aim is to introduce English phrases and vocabulary in an entertaining way, using conversational language along with repetition, rhythm and rhyme, cool music styles, and lots of humor—much the way we do on Sesame Street." Each quarter-hour episode combines new framing footage with Sesame Street inserts and clips.

The series stars a new Muppet character, Tingo, a multilingual "international tiger-like monster." Though all of the new footage was filmed in New York studios, 30 to 50 percent of Tingo's dialogue is dubbed into the native language of the target country. Tingo addresses viewers directly in the region specific language, but all other dialogue is in English. Tingo's explanations thus provide a bridge for native speakers to adjust to English. In 2003, Sesame Workshop announced a new variation, using the same footage, Sesame Español. Intended for viewing at Berlitz Language Centers, the variation used the same approach, only with Spanish as Tingo's secondary language, and with the aim now being instruction in Spanish for English-only speakers. DVD releases of the series, available in the U.S., include five available audio languages for Tingo's dialogue: Spanish, Hmong, Korean, Mandarin Chinese, and Vietnamese. An English only track is included for more advanced ESL students.

Characters and Cast
Tingo, the only new Muppet character, is a green, purple, and orange monster and an exchange student living in America with his best friend, Niki (played by Kelly Karbacz). Teenaged Niki lives in the basement of her parents' home, and has an extended circle of family and friends, including grandparents, siblings Katie and Kevin, baby Jake, and the members of her band. Niki's band, Children at Play, includes Mike, Sam (Samantha), and Tom. Stage actors Roger Bart and Jonathan Freeman play various members of Niki's circle, as well as episodic roles. Plots center around sports activities, music, and family get-togethers and social events.

External links
Official Site for Taiwan and Shanghai Broadcasts
Sesame Workshop: Sesame English
Sesame English DVD Catalogue, with Video Clips

1990s preschool education television series
2000s preschool education television series
American preschool education television series
American television shows featuring puppetry
Sesame Street international co-productions
Television series by Sesame Workshop